Gunn Margit Aas Andreassen (born 23 July 1973 in Kristiansand) is a former Norwegian biathlete.

Biathlon career
She won two Olympic medals, bronze in Nagano 1998 and silver in Salt Lake City 2002, both in the relay. From the World Championships she has the following results:
1995 - 1.pl (Team)
1995 - 3.pl (Relay)
1997 - 1.pl (Team)
1997 - 2.pl (Relay)
2004 - 1.pl (Relay)

In cross-country skiing she participated in one World Cup race, in which she finished 46th, in Beitostølen in November 2003. She represented Ringkollen SK, the club of her husband, in this sport.

Personal life
She is a daughter of Ivar Andreassen and niece of Reidar Andreassen. Both were skiers and runners. She was born in Kristiansand, but lived in Birkenes and represented Birkenes IL. She lives with fellow former biathlete, Frode Andresen, and they have three sons together, David, who was born around Christmas 2004 - now deceased, Nicolai, who was born in 2008 and Elias, who was born in August 2010.

References

External links
 
 

1973 births
Living people
Sportspeople from Kristiansand
Norwegian female biathletes
Biathletes at the 1994 Winter Olympics
Biathletes at the 1998 Winter Olympics
Biathletes at the 2002 Winter Olympics
Biathletes at the 2006 Winter Olympics
Olympic biathletes of Norway
Olympic bronze medalists for Norway
Olympic silver medalists for Norway
Norwegian female cross-country skiers
Olympic medalists in biathlon
Biathlon World Championships medalists
Medalists at the 2002 Winter Olympics
Medalists at the 1998 Winter Olympics
People from Birkenes
21st-century Norwegian women